The Wyman-Gordon 50,000-ton forging press is a forging press located at the Wyman-Gordon Grafton Plant that was built as part of the Heavy Press Program by the United States Air Force. It was manufactured by Loewy Hydropress of Pittsburgh, Pennsylvania and began operation in October, 1955.

References

External links
Photographs of the press

Wyman-Gordon
Historic American Engineering Record in Massachusetts
Industrial machinery